Wieloch is a Polish surname. Notable people with this surname include:

 Sławomir Wieloch (born 1969), Polish ice hockey player
 Tadeusz Wieloch (born 1950), Swedish neuroscientist and entrepreneur

See also
 

Polish-language surnames